Ahom may refer to:

Ahom people, an ethnic community in Assam
Ahom language, a language associated with the Ahom people
Ahom religion, an ethnic folk religion of Tai-Ahom people
Ahom alphabet, a script used to write the Ahom language
Ahom kingdom, a medieval kingdom in the Brahmaputra valley in Assam
Ahom Dynasty, the dynasty that reigned over the Ahom kingdom, in present day Assam. 
Ahom (Unicode block)

Language and nationality disambiguation pages